The 2013 IWBF Men's European Championship was the 21st edition of the European Wheelchair Basketball Championship held in Frankfurt, Germany  from 27 June to 8 July 2013.

Nations ranked 1 to 7 are qualified for participation at the 2014 World Championship in Incheon, South Korea.

Squads
Each of the 12 teams selected a squad of 12 players for the tournament.

Athletes are given an eight-level-score specific to wheelchair basketball, ranging from 0.5 to 4.5. Lower scores represent a higher degree of disability The sum score of all players on the court cannot exceed 14.

Preliminary round
All times local (UTC+02:00)

Group A

Group B

Knockout stage

Quarterfinals

Semifinals 

11th place game

9th place game

7th place game

5th place game

Bronze medal game

Final

Final standings

Awards

References

External links
 Official site

European Wheelchair Basketball Championship
2013 in wheelchair basketball
2012–13 in German basketball
2012–13 in European basketball
International basketball competitions hosted by Germany
Sports competitions in Frankfurt
21st century in Frankfurt